A collaborative practice agreement (CPA) is a legal document in the United States that establishes a legal relationship between clinical pharmacists and collaborating physicians that allows for pharmacists to participate in collaborative drug therapy management (CDTM).

CDTM is an expansion of the traditional pharmacist scope of practice, allowing for pharmacist-led management of drug related problems (DRPs) with an emphasis on a collaborative, interdisciplinary approach to pharmacy practice in the healthcare setting. The terms of a CPA are decided by the collaborating pharmacist and physician, though templates exist online. CPAs can be specific to a patient population of interest to the two parties, a specific clinical situation or disease state, and/or may outline an evidence-based protocol for managing the drug regimen of patients under the CPA. CPAs have become the subject of intense debate within the pharmacy and medical professions.

A CPA can be referred to as a consult agreement, physician-pharmacist agreement, standing order or protocol, or physician delegation.

History
According to healthcare researcher Karen E. Koch, the first coining of the term "collaborative drug therapy management" can be traced back to William A. Zellmer's 1995 publication in the American Journal of Health-System Pharmacy. Zellmer advocates use of the term "collaborative drug therapy management" instead of "prescribing," arguing that it will make legislation that expands the authority of pharmacists more palatable to lawmakers (and physician stakeholders). Most importantly, it centers the discussion on why pharmacists are interested in expanding that authority: to improve patient care through interdisciplinary collaboration. The modern concept of collaborative practice was derived, in part, to avoid the controversial term of dependent prescribing authority.

The term "collaborative practice agreement" has also been referred to as a consult agreement, collaborative pharmacy practice agreement, physician-pharmacist agreement, standing order or standing protocol, and physician delegation. A collaborative practice agreement is a legal document in the United States that establishes a formal relationship between pharmacists (often clinical pharmacy specialists) and collaborating physicians for the purpose of establishing a legal and ethical basis for pharmacists to participate in collaborative drug therapy management.

Legal guidance and requirements for the formation of CPAs are established on a state by state basis. The federal government approved CPAs in 1995. Washington was the first state to pass legislation allowing for the formal formation of CPAs. In 1979, Washington amended the Practice of Pharmacy Requirements providing for the formation of "collaborative drug therapy agreements." As of February 2016, 48 states and Washington D.C. have approved laws that allow for the provision of CPAs. The only two states that do not allow for the provision of CPAs are Alabama and Delaware. Alabama pharmacists had hoped to see a CPA law, House Bill 494, pass in 2015. The bill was introduced by Alabama House Representative Ron Johnson but died in committee.

As of 2010, Medicare Part B does not provide reimbursement for pharmacists. The Pharmacy and Medically Underserved Areas Enhancement Act (H.R. 592 / S. 109) was introduced in both the House and the Senate in January 2017. This would allow pharmacists to be reimbursed through Medicare Part B for providing healthcare services in federally-defined medically underserved communities. These must be services that pharmacists are licensed to perform in their particular state, and services in which physicians would have been reimbursed for under Medicare.

Below is a list of US states that have approved CPAs and the year that they were approved (and/or later updated), as of February 2016:

Effect on outcomes
CPAs have been implemented for the management of a plethora of chronic disease states, including diabetes mellitus, asthma, and hypertension. Evidence suggests that CPAs have resulted in beneficial health outcomes for patients involved. It has been shown that pharmacists working with providers under CPAs help deliver higher quality of care in the oncology setting, including the management of antiemetic (anti-vomiting) therapy. Within these settings, CPAs have resulted in improved attainment of goal laboratory values like hemoglobin A1c for diabetics, improved lung function for asthmatics, and improved blood pressure control for people with hypertension.

CPAs can be used as tools for pharmacists to better integrate with practicing clinicians in accountable care organization (ACO) offices, alleviate the time constraints of primary care visits, and help minimize delays in managing patients' chronic conditions.

Pharmacy services
Pharmacists involved in CPAs may participate in clinical services that are outside of the traditional scope of practice for pharmacists. Notably, pharmacists do not need to participate in CPAs to provide many pharmacy practice services that are already covered by their traditional scope of practice, such as performing medication therapy management, providing disease prevention services (e.g. immunizations), engaging in public health screenings (e.g. screening patients for depressive disorders, such as major depressive disorder, via administering the PHQ-2), providing disease-state specific education (e.g. as a certified diabetes educator), and counseling patients on information regarding their medications.

Expanded pharmacy services under a CPA are described as collaborative drug therapy management (CDTM).  While the traditional scope of practice for pharmacists provides for the legal authority to detect drug related problems (DRPs) and provide suggestions for solving DRPs to prescribers (such as physicians), pharmacists that provide CDTM directly solve DRPs when they detect them. This may involve prescribing activities, which include selecting and initiating medications for the treatment of a patient's diagnosed illnesses (as outlined in the CPA), discontinuing the use of prescription or over-the-counter medications, modifying a patient's drug therapy (e.g. changing the strength, frequency, route of drug administration, or duration of therapy), evaluating a patient's response to drug therapy (which may include ordering and performing laboratory tests, such as a basic metabolic panel), and continuing drug therapy (providing a new prescription).

Other services may include administering medications, especially those administered parenterally (e.g. long-acting, injectable antipsychotics).

Variation by state
The legal provisions of CPAs vary on a state-by-state basis. This affects the specific services that pharmacists are allowed to perform pursuant to a CPA, as well as the terms of the arrangement (e.g. requirements for CPA renewal). Wisconsin's "Wisconsin Act 294," for example, has been described by the American Pharmacists Association (APhA) as granting some of the most expansive powers to pharmacists in any state CPA law.

Pharmacist advocacy
CPAs are a focus of advocacy efforts for professional pharmacy organizations. In January 2012, the American Pharmacists Association (APhA) convened a consortium composed of pharmacy, medicine, and nursing stakeholders representing 12 states to discuss the integration of CPAs into everyday clinical practice. The consortium published a white paper titled "Consortium Recommendations for Advancing Pharmacists' Patient Care Services and Collaborative Practice Agreements," summarizing their recommendations.

In July 2015, the National Alliance of State Pharmacy Associations (NASPA) convened a working group composed of appointees from the CEOs of Joint Commission of Pharmacy Practitioners (JCPP) member organizations, the National Association of Chain Drug Stores, and individual states. The 18 member working group's report made recommendations towards what state lawmakers should include in CPA laws.

In 2015, the American College of Clinical Pharmacy (ACCP) published an updated white paper on the subject of collaborative drug therapy management. The ACCP periodically publishes updates on the subject, with previous publications in 2003 and 1997. The paper describes the recent history of CPAs, the legislative progress, and discusses payment models for collaborative drug therapy management activities.

Physician perspective
CPAs have been met with mixed reviews by physicians and physician advocacy groups.

Praise
In a 2011 commentary for the American College of Clinical Pharmacy (ACCP), healthcare policy consultant and physician Terry McInnis stressed the need for pharmacist–physician collaboration to improve positive patient outcomes and to decrease healthcare costs. In the final paragraph, she makes an appeal towards pharmacists interested in pursuing CPAs:

For pharmacists, I believe that you have come to one of the rare crossroads that will define the future of your profession. You will either take your place as providers of care, or your numbers will dwindle as most dispensing activities are replaced by robotics and pharmacy technicians. I am a physician, and I say our profession and the patients that we serve need you 'on the team' as clinical pharmacist practitioners. But, will you truly join us?

In the keynote address of the 2013 APhA annual meeting, Reid Blackwelder, President of the American Academy of Family Physicians (AAFP), advocated for a "collaborative view of health care."

Criticism
In 2012, the AAFP produced a position paper that expressed support for CPAs, but stressed the risk of fragmenting care if pharmacists were given fully autonomous prescribing privileges.

In 2010, the American Medical Association (AMA) published a series of reports called the "AMA Scope of Practice Data Series." One of the reports was focused on the profession of pharmacy, which criticized the formation of CPAs as an attempt to encroach upon the physician's scope of practice by pharmacists. In response to the report, a collaboration of seven national professional pharmacy associations drafted a response to the AMA's report on pharmacists. The response urged the AMA to correct their report, and to publish the revised report with errata. In 2011, the House of Delegates of the AMA adopted a softer tone by APhA in response to input from it and other professional pharmacy associations, ultimately passing the following resolution that refocused attention on opposing independent (rather than collaborative, or dependent) practice agreements:

That our AMA develop model state legislation to address the expansion of pharmacist scope of practice that is found to be inappropriate or constitutes the practice of medicine, including but not limited to the issue of interpretations or usage of independent practice arrangements without appropriate physician supervision and work with interested states and specialties to advance such legislation (Directive to Take Action).

Footnotes

References

External links 
 Example CPA, provided by the Pennsylvania Pharmacists Association
 Collaborative Practice Agreements and Pharmacists' Patient Care Services, a resource guide for pharmacists on CPAs provided by the CDC
 ''Consortium Recommendations for Advancing Pharmacists’ Patient Care Services and Collaborative Practice Agreements, white paper produced by APhA's 2012 consortium
 An hour-long continuing education CPA webinar, provided by the Colorado Pharmacists Society
 Guidance document, provided by the Tennessee Pharmacists Association
 Joint letter by national professional pharmacy associations to the American Medical Association (AMA), in response to the 2010 AMA Scope of Practice Data Series

Agreements
Medical regulation in the United States